Boston Hall is a Grade II listed neo-classical house in Boston Spa, West Yorkshire, England.

History

The main part of the house was completed in 1807, although there are subsequent later additions. The house was Grade II listed on 30 March 1966 (List Entry Number
1135046); the listing stated that it was made of "Ashlar magnesian limestone" with a "stone slate roof" and consisted of three stories, a two-story rear wing and an attached wall. At that time, the house was being used as a store selling furniture.

In 1939 Boston Hall was the home of Charles H Roe and his wife Kathleen.

Later, for many years, the house was used as offices by the Ogden Group. In 2013, planning permission was sought to return the building to residential use after the purchase of the property by former England and Yorkshire cricketer, Geoffrey Boycott. The plan was approved.

In 2019, the property was listed for sale by Boycott because he and his wife Rachel planned to move to the Cheshire area where their daughter was residing. A report at that time indicated that the property consisted of four elements, each with its own entrance: "the main house, the west wing, the cottage and the flat". Features included 11 bedrooms, several reception rooms and a huge eat-in kitchen.

Architecture
The house has two storeys and is built out of squared magnesian limestone with five bays to the main part, it has a pitched slate roof.  The west wing of the house is of three storeys and has two bays.

See also
Listed buildings in Boston Spa

References

External links

Houses completed in 1807
Grade II listed buildings in West Yorkshire
Grade II listed houses
Boston Spa